Claassen or Claassens is an  Afrikaans, Dutch and Low German patronymic surname. It may refer to:

Arthur Claassen (1859–1920), German orchestral  conductor
Ben Claassen III (born 1977), American comics artist and illustrator
 (born 1969), Dutch jazz singer
George Claassen (born ca. 1950), South African writer, brother of Wynand
J. G. Claassen (born 1991), South African golfer
Johan Claassen (1929–2019), South African rugby player
Neil Claassen (born 1992), South African rugby player
Peter Walter Claassen (1886–1937), American entomologist
Claasenia, a genus of stoneflies, Claassen's skolly, a butterfly
Ruben Claassen (born 1993), South African cricketer
 (born 1964), Dutch sculptor
Utz Claassen (born 1963), German manager
Wynand Claassen (born 1951), South African rugby player, brother of George
Claassens
Errie Claassens (born 1981), South African rugby player
Michael Claassens (born 1982), South African rugby player

See also
Claessen
Claessens
Clason (disambiguation)
Classun
Clausen
Claussen
Klaassen
Klassen

Dutch-language surnames
Low German surnames
Patronymic surnames
Surnames from given names